Dance with a Stranger may refer to one of the following:

Dance with a Stranger, a 1985 film
Jack and Jill (dance), a dance competition format
Dance with a Stranger (band), a Norwegian rock band